Brzeźniki  is a settlement in the administrative district of Gmina Świeszyno, within Koszalin County, West Pomeranian Voivodeship, in north-western Poland. 

It has a population of 12.

References

Villages in Koszalin County